Yu Myung-hwan (born April 8, 1946) is a South Korean diplomat, he was Minister for Foreign Affairs and Trade from February 2008 to September 2010. His resignation was caused when his daughter was given a job in his department . He has previously held posts including Ambassador to Israel, Japan and the Philippines. Yu received his bachelor's degree in public administration from Seoul National University.

Nepotism charges
In 2010, Yu has resigned over accusations of nepotism involving his daughter. Yu's daughter, Yu Hyun-sun, was employed at the foreign ministry as a mid-level director through a special employment program.

Honours
 Grand Cordon of the Order of the Rising Sun (2015)

References

External links 

1946 births
Living people
Seoul National University School of Law alumni
Foreign ministers of South Korea
Ryu clan of Munhwa
Ambassadors of South Korea to Japan
Ambassadors of South Korea to the Philippines
Ambassadors of South Korea to Israel